Ajoneuvos is a 2006 Finnish driving television series broadcast in Finland on MTV3 since March 18, 2006. The series is presented by Jussi Halli.

External links
 

Finnish television shows
Automotive television series
2000s Finnish television series
2010s Finnish television series
2006 Finnish television series debuts
MTV3 original programming
Finnish non-fiction television series